The Furies is a novel written by Keith Roberts and published in 1966.

Plot summary
The Furies is a novel in which there is an invasion of giant killer wasps.

Reception
Colin Greenland reviewed The Furies for Imagine magazine, and stated that "Roberts was already (in 1966) showing his talent for vivid description and detailed landscape, the scarred countryside of Wiltshire where our hero gets firmly dug in."

Reviews
Review by Judith Merril (1966) in The Magazine of Fantasy and Science Fiction, November 1966
Review by Chris Priest (1967) in Vector 42

References

1966 novels